Kristin Thornton (born 5 March 1988) is an Australian rules footballer.

He was recruited as the number 54 draft pick in the 2005 AFL draft from Peel Thunder. He made his debut for the Sydney Swans in round 8 against the Carlton Blues kicking one goal.

He was delisted by the Swans at the end of the 2008 season after suffering an ACL injury, the same injury which destroyed his brother's AFL career "Ash" while at the West Coast Eagles. He was handed a lifeline after the Swans decided to pick him up in the rookie draft of 2008.

He was delisted again by Sydney at the end of season 2010, and returned to Peel Thunder, where he won the Dudley Tuckey Medal as the club's best and fairest in 2011.

External links

1988 births
Living people
Australian rules footballers from Western Australia
Sydney Swans players
Peel Thunder Football Club players
People from Harvey, Western Australia
Harvey Brunswick Leschenault Football Club players